This was the first edition of the tournament.

Coco Gauff and Caty McNally won the title, defeating Darija Jurak and Andreja Klepač in the final, 6–3, 6–2. At 17 years old, Gauff became the youngest player since Maria Sharapova in 2004 to win the singles and doubles titles at the same event.

Seeds

Draw

Draw

References

External Links
Main Draw

2021 WTA Tour
Emilia-Romagna Open